Oleksandr Stanislavovych Ulianenko (August 14 (officially May 8), 1962 – August 17, 2010) was a Ukrainian writer known by the pen name Oles Ulianenko. He was the youngest winner of the Shevchenko National Prize, which he received in 1997, at the age of 35, for his novel Stalinka (1994).

He also won awards from the magazines Suchasnist and Blahovist.

Personal life
Ulianenko graduated from Mykolaiv Nautical School and served in the Soviet Air Forces in Germany and Afghanistan. While living in Leningrad, he became acquainted with local rock music, learned to play the guitar and tried to form a band. He was married for seven years before getting divorced.

Career 
At various points, Ulianenko's work was censored by the Ukrainian government for its explicit content. In 2009, for example, Ukraine's National Television and Broadcasting Council, on the recommendation of the National Expert Commission of Ukraine on the Protection of Public Morality, blocked the publication of his novel Жінка його мрії ("The Woman of His Dreams").

Ulianenko's last work published during his lifetime was a criminal melodrama called Там, де Південь ("Where the South Is"), released in December 1999. In 2000, he wrote the screenplay for the film Украдене Щастя ("Stolen Happiness") with the director Andrii Donchyk, based on a play of the same name by Ivan Franko. The fourth part of the film was released in 2004.

The book Oles Ulianenko: Without Censorship was released on August 15, 2010, to mark Ulianenko's 48th birthday. It includes approximately 40 interviews with him conducted by multiple publications and television channels from 1994–2010. It also includes a detailed description and documents from Ulianenko's lawsuit against the National Expert Commission of Ukraine on the Protection of Public Morality, prepared by his lawyer, Oleh Veremiienko.

Ulianenko died on August 17, 2010, in his apartment in Kyiv under unclear circumstances. He was buried in Kyiv Baikove Cemetery (Section 33).

In April 2013, a revised edition of The Woman of His Dreams was published.

Bibliography

Novels 
Stalinka (1994)
Winter's Tale (1995)
Fire Eye (1997)
Bohemian Rhapsody (1999)
Son of the Shadow (2001)
Dauphin of Satan (2003)
Sign of Savoofa (2003)
Flowers of Sodom (2005)
Serafima (2007)
The Woman of His Dreams (2010)
Prorok (2013)

Short stories
"Siedoi" (2003)
"Where the South Is" (2010)

Trilogies
Angels of Revenge (2012)

References

External links
 2009 Human Rights Reports: Ukraine - U.S. Department of State

1962 births
2010 deaths
People from Khorol
Writers from Kyiv
Recipients of the Shevchenko National Prize
Ukrainian novelists
20th-century novelists